The sultan of the Sultanate of Oman is the monarchical head of state and head of government of Oman. It is the most powerful position in the country. The sultans of Oman are members of the Busaid dynasty, which has been the ruling family of Oman since the mid-18th century. 

Haitham bin Tariq is the current sultan, reigning since 11 January 2020.

List of imams (751–1406)

List of imams (1406–1749)

Nabhani dynasty (1406–1624)

Yaruba dynasty (1624–1749)

List of sultans (1749–present)

Succession

On 12 January 2021, the current Sultan, Haitham bin Tariq officially changed the Basic Law of State, stipulating the creation of the post for the Crown Prince of Oman and appointed his first son, Theyazin bin Haitham as the apparent successor, making him the first Crown Prince of the Sultanate.

2021 changes
On 11 January 2021, the new Sultan, Haitham bin Tariq changed the Basic law of the state and charted out the procedures for succession in the future.

As per the new rules, the power shall be transferred from the Sultan to his eldest son and then to the eldest son of the Heir Apparent. In case the eldest son of the sultan is no more, then the power will be transferred to the eldest son of the Heir Apparent.

If the Heir Apparent has no sons, then the power should be transferred to the eldest of his brothers. In Case the heir apparent has no brothers, then the powers shall transfer to the son of the eldest of his brothers and so on as per the sequence of the ages of the brothers.

In case there exists no brothers or sons of brothers to the Heir Apparent, then the rule shall transfer to the uncles (only from the fathers' side) and their sons as per the order set by the paragraph (2) of the Basic Law of the State. It is also stated the Heir apparent must be a Muslim and legitimate son of Omani Muslim parents.

Article (3) of the Law states that if the transfer of power is made to a person aged under 21, then the power of the Sultan shall be undertaken by a trusteeship council appointed by a Royal Will and in case of non-appointment of such a council before his death, the Royal Family Council will appoint a trusteeship council comprising one of the brothers of the Sultan and two sons of his uncles. 

The system of the trusteeship council shall be issued by a Royal Decree.  Article (7) states that a Royal Order shall be issued on the appointment of the Heir Apparent to assume power and the prerogatives and duties to be assigned to him.   

The Heir Apparent shall be sworn in before the Sultan before exercising his prerogatives and duties.

Article (8) says that in case it is not temporarily possible for the Sultan to exercise his powers, then the Heir Apparent shall assume such powers.

See also

 History of Oman
 Imamate of Oman
 Omani Empire
 Muscat and Oman
 Sultanate of Zanzibar
 List of sultans of Zanzibar

References
General
 
 
 
Specific

Bibliography
 

History of Oman
Oman
Rulers